Sebastián Patricio Toro Hormazábal (born 2 February 1990) is a Chilean footballer who last played for Unión San Felipe. A central defender, he can also play as a full back.

He started in Colo-Colo's first team when Miguel Riffo and Luis Mena were injured and there were no other replacements. Since then he has become a member of the starting squad. He was registered for play accompanying Colo-Colo in the 2010 Copa Libertadores with the shirt Nº8.

International goals

Honours

Club
Colo-Colo
 Chilean Primera División (3): 2008 Clausura, 2009 Clausura, 2014 Clausura

References

External links
 
 
 

1990 births
Living people
Footballers from Santiago
Chilean footballers
Chilean expatriate footballers
Chile international footballers
Colo-Colo footballers
Colo-Colo B footballers
Ñublense footballers
Atlético Junior footballers
Deportes Iquique footballers
Club Deportivo Palestino footballers
KF Laçi players
Deportes Colina footballers
Unión San Felipe footballers
Chilean Primera División players
Primera B de Chile players
Segunda División Profesional de Chile players
Categoría Primera A players
Kategoria Superiore players
Chilean expatriate sportspeople in Colombia
Chilean expatriate sportspeople in Albania
Expatriate footballers in Colombia
Expatriate footballers in Albania
Association football central defenders